10 Andromedae, abbreviated 10 And, is an astrometric binary star system in the northern constellation of Andromeda. 10 Andromedae is the Flamsteed designation. It has an apparent visual magnitude of approximately 5.81, which means it is faintly visible to the naked eye. The system is moving toward the Earth with a heliocentric radial velocity of −1.1 km/s.

The visible component is an aging red giant star with a stellar classification of M0 III, which indicates it has consumed the hydrogen at its core and evolved off the main sequence. At the estimated distance of 10 And, this yields a physical size of about 33 times the radius of the Sun. It is radiating 259 times the Sun's luminosity from its enlarged photosphere.

References

M-type giants
Andromeda (constellation)
BD+41 4752
Andromedae, 10
219981
115191
8876
Astrometric binaries